There are over 100 castles and forts in Georgia, which were constructed between the years 800 and 1700 by various provincial kings. The castles and forts have long been abandoned, but most are still standing, and some are preserved by the United Nations.

The earliest castle in Georgia was the Ananuri castle, which was built in the period from 1200–1249. The Ananuri castle consisted of two castles with a big curtain wall surrounding it. It was the seat of the dukes of the Duchy of Aragvi, which was one of multiple feudal dynasties during the period.

The last castle to be built in Georgia was the Rabati Castle, which was built between 1250 and 1299. The original town was built from 700–800, with the castle being built in the 1260s. From the 1260s to the 1340s the castle and the surrounding town was the capital city of the province of Samtskhe-Saatabago, which was ruled by the House of Jaqeli.

The forts of Georgia lie in varying states of ruin. The oldest was built in the 9th century, while some were built as late as the 17th century. While many still stand, most have been heavily damaged by various causes.

Citadel Tbilisi 
Tbilisi

Castles

Forts and fortresses

References

Citations

Bibliography 
Anonymous (1223). History of the Five Reigns
Noble, John; Kohn, Michael; Systermans, Daniel. (2008).  Georgia, Armenia & Azerbaijan. London, UK: Lonely Planet. 
Rosen, Roger (1999). Georgia: A Sovereign Country of the Caucasus. Hong Kong: Odyssey Publications.

Web sources 
 

Castles and forts in Georgia (country)
Georgia
Fortifications
Fortifications